Bernardo Fort-Brescia is a US-based Peruvian businessman and architect. He is the co-founder of the architectural firm Arquitectonica. He is a fellow of the American Institute of Architects (AIA). He won the AIA Silver Medal. He is also an heir to Grupo Breca.

Early life
Bernardo Fort-Brescia was born in Lima, Peru on November 19, 1951 into the Brescia family. His Italian-born grandfather, Fortunato Brescia Tassano, founded Grupo Breca, a real estate company-turned-conglomerate. His mother, Rosa Brescia Cafferata, is a billionaire heiress. His brother Alex Fort Brescia, is a businessman.

Fort-Brescia studied architecture and urban planning at Princeton University and obtained his master's degree in architecture from Harvard University.

With his brother, Fort-Brescia manages his mother's investments in Grupo Breca, their family conglomerate.

Selected projects
Bronx Museum of the Arts, Bronx, New York
Atlantis Condominium, Miami, Florida
Brickell City Centre, Miami, Florida
Grand Hyatt San Antonio, San Antonio, Texas
The Infinity, San Francisco, California
Philips Arena, Atlanta, Georgia
City of Dreams (casino) Resort, Macau, China
TaiKoo Hui, Guangzhou
International Finance Center, Seoul, South Korea
SMX Convention Center, Pasay, Manila
Festival Walk, Kowloon Tong, Kowloon
Icon Brickell, Miami, Florida
PortMiami Tunnel, Miami, Florida
Jorge Chavez International Airport, Lima, Peru
Port of Xiamen Cruise Ship Terminals and Mixed-use Development, Xiamen, China
Microsoft European Headquarters, Paris, France
University of Miami School of Architecture Design Studio, Coral Gables, Florida
University of Miami Donna E. Shalala Student Center, Coral Gables, Florida
University of Miami Student Housing Village, Coral Gables, Florida
Florida International University School of International and Public Affairs, Miami, Florida
United States Embassy, Lima, Peru
Mandarin Oriental Hotel, Shanghai, China
Whirlpool U.S. Headquarters, Benton, Michigan
Cyberport Technology Campus and Le Meridien Hotel, Hong Kong, China
Miami City Ballet, Miami Beach, Florida
American Airlines Arena, Miami, Florida
High School for Construction Trades, Engineering and Architecture, New York, New York
Westin New York at Times Square, New York, New York
SLS Lux Brickell Hotel and Residences, Miami, Florida
Lake Nona Town Center Hotel, Orlando, Florida
South Miami-Dade Cultural Arts Center, Miami, Florida
Gulfshore Playhouse, Naples, Florida
Banco de Credito del Peru Headquarters, Lima, Peru

Exhibitions
City of Culture: New Architecture for the Arts, New York, New York
Pratt Institute 50 Years of Record Houses, New York, New York
Exposition Cité de l'Architecture, Paris, France
Municipal Art Society, New York, New York
The Skyscraper Museum, New York, New York
The Chicago Athenaeum Museum of Architecture and Design, Chicago, Italy and Greece
Urban Land Institute, Miami Beach, Florida
Cooper-Hewitt National Design Museum, Smithsonian Institution, New York
Smith College Art Gallery
The Sixth International Venice Architecture Biennale, Venice, Italy
Phillipe Uzzan, Paris
Gallery MA, Tokyo, Japan
Centrum voor Architectuur en Stedebouw, Brussels, Belgium
Stadt Frankfurt am Main, Frankfurt, Germany
Architekturforum, Zurich, Switzerland
Ontvangsthal Veldkamp, Raalte, Netherlands
Galerie Westersingel 8, Rotterdam, Netherlands
Gemeente Bibliotheek, Middelburg, Netherlands
Arc en Reve, Bordeaux, France
Bass Museum, Miami Beach, Florida
Institut Francais d’ Architecture (IFA), Paris, France
Bienal de Buenos Aires
Institute of Contemporary Art, Philadelphia, Pennsylvania
Bienale de Paris, France
Yale University, “Young Architects”, New Haven, Connecticut

Lectures and jury panels
University of Miami Real Estate Impact Conference “Global Urban Design and Miami 2020”
Perspective Architecture Awards Judging Panel
Head Juror, American Institute of Architects Columbus Design Awards
American Institute of Architects National Convention Presentation, “Miami: Public Buildings for Urban Regeneration”
MIPIM Lecture Panel “My Architect(s): Genuine visions to address global cities challenges / Berlin-*London-Los Angeles-New York-Paris-Rotterdam-Seoul-Tokyo”
Council on Tall Buildings and Urban Habitat (CTBUH) Conference, Mumbai - “Remaking of Sustainable Cities in the Vertical Age” - Cities Within Cities
Keynote Speaker at MUDD (Mixed-use Design Development) Asia
Abu Dhabi, Cityscape Green & Sustainable Design Discussion Panel
Abu Dhabi CityScape, National Exhibition Centre “Is Sustainability Cost Effective?”
Ohio Construction Conference: “Design Review” - The Builders Exchange of Central Ohio
Urban Land Institute Stararchitects Working on the Las Vegas Strip, Las Vegas, Nevada
American Institute of Architects Academy of Architecture for Justice Sustainable Justice 6th International Conference on Courthouse Design, New York, New York
Buenos Aires Bienal, Buenos Aires, Argentina
National Building Museum: Honor Award - Salute to The Related Companies / The Related Group, Washington DC
American Institute of Architects New York Chapter Architecture Inside/Out Housing Committee and The American Planning Association's New York Metro Chapter Waterfront Committee: New Waterfront Housing
World Architecture Congress at Cityscape China: Emotion and Reason: Architecture in the age of Social and Environmental Responsibility, from Shelter to Architecture, Shanghai, China
San Francisco Real Estate Brokers: New Trends in Residential Building Design, San Francisco, California

References

External links
 Arquitectonica website
 The Architects Who Made Miami ‘Magic’
 Landmark firm Arquitectonica continues to shape Miami and beyond

Living people
People from Lima
Princeton University School of Architecture alumni
Harvard Graduate School of Design alumni
Architects from Florida
Fellows of the American Institute of Architects
Brescia family
Year of birth missing (living people)
Arquitectonica people